Coleophora saxauli is a moth of the family Coleophoridae. It is found in Turkestan and Uzbekistan.

The larvae feed on the fruit of Haloxylon persicum and Haloxylon aphyllum. They are yellowish-white with a chocolate-brown head. They reach a length of 5–6 mm and can be found from the end of September to October. The larvae hibernate in sand covered cocoons after feeding.

References

saxauli
Moths of Asia
Moths described in 1970